The Czech Republic women's national tennis team is the representative national team of the Czech Republic in Billie Jean King Cup competition. The Czech Republic team in its current incarnation began competing in 1993. It is seen as the primary successor to the Czechoslovak team, and not Slovakia, even though the Czechoslovak team included both Czech and Slovak players.

Czechoslovakia won the Billie Jean King Cup five times between 1975 and 1988 (when the competition was known as the Federation Cup), but the victory in 2011 (by which time the competition had been renamed the Fed Cup) was the team's first win as the Czech Republic. They have since won the competition five more times, in 2012, 2014, 2015, 2016 and 2018.

Martina Navratilova, one of the Czechoslovak team's greatest players, helped guide the team to victory in 1975. In 1981 she became a US citizen and in later tournaments, notably the 1986 Federation Cup final, she played for the United States against her former nation.

Current team
Rankings .

Players

Results

1990–1999

2000–2009

2010–2019

2020–2029

 Slovakia Billie Jean King Cup team

References

External links 
 
  – Official web 

Billie Jean King Cup teams
Billie Jean King Cup
Billie Jean King Cup